Belden may refer to:

Places

United States
 Belden, California
 Belden, Colorado
 Belden, Illinois
 Belden, Minnesota
 Belden, Mississippi
 Belden, Nebraska
 Belden, North Dakota
 Belden, Ohio

Other uses
 Belden (electronics company), an American electronics company based in St. Louis, Missouri
 Belden (given name), a masculine given name
 Belden (surname), an Americanized surname
 Belden Brick Company, an American brick manufacturer